Lancelot Machattie "Mac" Smith (c. 1885 - March 1956) was a rugby union player who represented Australia.

Smith, a centre, was born in Bathurst, New South Wales and claimed one international rugby cap for Australia, playing against New Zealand, at Dunedin, on 2 September 1905.

References

Australian rugby union players
Australia international rugby union players
1880s births
Year of birth uncertain

1956 deaths
Rugby union players from New South Wales
Rugby union centres